Calgary-Forest Lawn was a provincial electoral district in Calgary, Alberta, Canada, mandated to return a single member to the Legislative Assembly of Alberta using the first past the post method of voting from 1979 to 1993.

History
The Calgary-Forest Lawn electoral district was created in the 1979 electoral re-distribution from the southern end of the Calgary-McCall electoral district. The riding was abolished in the 1993 electoral district re-distribution when it merged with part of Calgary-Millican to re-form Calgary-East.

The riding was named after the Calgary community and former town of Forest Lawn.

Members of the Legislative Assembly (MLAs)

Election results

1979 general election

1982 general election

1986 general election

1989 general election

See also
List of Alberta provincial electoral districts

References

Further reading

External links
Elections Alberta
The Legislative Assembly of Alberta

Former provincial electoral districts of Alberta
Politics of Calgary